Heard Ranier Ferguson is a studio album by 1980s jazz trio Heard Ranier Ferguson, composed of bassist John Heard, pianist Tom Ranier and drummer Sherman Ferguson. All highly experienced musicians with a wealth of recordings behind them.

The album
The album was the third release for Californian record label ITI Records in 1983, then a fledgling label. It was Manufactured and marketed by Allegiance Records Ltd.

The album was what could be expected from a small jazz group such as Heard Ranier Ferguson. As an experienced trio they worked well together on it. Ranier's piano was the dominant sound with the presence of Heard's bass being felt. The material covered included classics from Count Basie, Duke Ellington and Billy Strayhorn etc.

Re-releases
The album first made it to compact disc in 1987 as Back To Back issued on Allegiance, expanded with three extra tracks that weren't on the original album. They were "Tricitism", "Tones for Joan's Bones" and "In Walked Bud"  .

It was announced on the Jazz Monthly website in 2012 that their album along with others by Ruth Price, Tom Garvin, Bill Mays and Red Mitchell were to be re-released that year as the ITI Records back catalogue was being released through Warrant Music. It has been released again in May 2015.

Heard Ranier Ferguson

Back To Back

Releases

Reviews
  Review by Bob Karlovits of the Pittsburgh Express

References

1983 albums
Jazz albums by American artists